The Douglas Wilkie Medal is an award presented to those who do the least for Australian rules football, in the best and fairest manner. An accolade presented by the Anti-Football League, it is named after Douglas Wilkie, a Sun News-Pictorial columnist who wrote for the paper during the years 1946–1986. It was Douglas Wilkie who first suggested the notion of an Anti-Football League, which was brought into being by Keith Dunstan. The League exists as a response to the overwhelming obsession of football by the Melbourne public.

The award is the League's answer to the Australian Football League's Brownlow Medal, an honour bestowed on footballers who throughout the season play in a skilled and sportsmanlike fashion.

Following the suggestion of Wilkie's fellow writer Cyril Pearl, who wished to burn a football to express his disaffection for the game, the winner must destroy a football in a unique and creative manner on receiving their medal.

Previous winners

 1967 – Harold Holt, Prime Minister of Australia
 1968 – Bob Skilton, football player
 1969 – Ron Frazer, actor
 1970 – Barry Oakley, author A Salute to the Great McCarthy: a Novel (1970) ; the book was filmed in 1975 under the same name.
 1972 – Cyril Pearl, author
 1973 – Doug McClelland, politician
 1974 – Leon Hill, former General Manager GTV-9
 1975 – Barry Humphries, writer, actor, bohemian
 1977 – Kate Baillieu, former GTV-9 personality
 1979 – Pete Smith, television announcer
 1980 – Jack Elliot, racing writer
 1981 – Lindsay Thompson, Premier of Victoria
 1983 – Julie Clarke, a suffering housewife
 1985 – Shelley Dye, another suffering housewife
 1986 – Sir Les Patterson, alter-ego of Barry Humphries
 1987 – Peter Russell-Clarke, celebrity chef
 1988 – Terry Lane, radio broadcaster
 1989 – Raelene Boyle, athlete
 1990 – Tim Bowden, ABC broadcaster and author
 1992 – Wendy Harmer, broadcaster and comedian
 1993 – Tim Bowden, broadcaster
 1994 – Dennis Pryor, author and broadcaster
 2007 – Barry Jones, former quiz champion, politician, author
 2008 – Michael Leunig, cartoonist
 2010 – Catherine Deveny, columnist
 2011 – Brian Troy, a 74-year-old Melburnian, who has never attended an Australian rules football match.

References

Australian rules football awards
Ironic and humorous awards